Devolution is the fourth full-length studio album from American crossover thrash band, M.O.D. It was released in 1994 on Music For Nations and follows 1992's Rhythm of Fear.

Following the tradition of ever-changing line-ups, this album saw Milano swapping bass for guitar as well as vocal duties, with Dave Chavarri on drums being the only other member to appear on two consecutive albums. Tommy Klimchuck and Rob Moschetti took up the guitar and bass roles respectively.

In 2004, Blackout Records re-issued the album with a different cover and enhanced CD content of a concert in France in 1993.

Track listing

Enhanced CD content
 Live at Club Bikini, Toulouse, France – September 14, 1993 – 31:03

Credits
 Billy Milano – vocals, guitar
 Tommy Klimchuck – guitar
 Rob Moschetti – bass
 Dave Chavarri – drums
 Recorded and mixed at Pyramid Sound, Ithaca, New York, USA
 Produced and mixed by Rob Hunter and Billy Milano
 Mastered by Alex Perialas
 Original cover art by Anthony Ferrara
 Re-issue cover art by Rick Rios

References

External links
Blackout Records album page
MOD and SOD official fansite

1994 albums
M.O.D. albums
Music for Nations albums